Minor Swing may refer to:
 "Minor Swing" (composition) by Django Reinhardt & Stéphane Grappelli
 Minor Swing (album) by Big John Patton